David John Robert Thornalley is a British paleoceanographer known for his work on North Atlantic circulation change during the Quaternary period. Thornalley holds masters and doctoral degrees from Churchill College, Cambridge. He is currently an associate professor in the department of Geography at University College London (UCL). Before working at UCL, he was a postdoctoral research scholar at Woods Hole Oceanographic Institution and a postdoctoral research associate at Cardiff University. Thornalley also holds a Professional Certificate in Teaching and Learning in Higher and Professional Education.

Awards

In 2015 Thornalley was awarded the UCL Student Choice Outstanding Teacher award.

In 2016 Thornalley was awarded a £100,000 Philip Leverhulme Prize for early-career researchers with internationally impactful research.

References

External links
Atlantic Ocean circulation at weakest point in more than 1,500 years

1982 births
Living people
Alumni of Churchill College, Cambridge
British oceanographers
British climatologists
British geochemists
Academics of University College London